Slavník (died 981) was a White Croatian Bohemian nobleman, and the founder of the Slavník dynasty. Slavník rose to power during the reign of Boleslaus II of the Přemyslid dynasty. Slavník controlled significant estates within central Bohemia, and was overlord of the site of Libice nad Cidlinou.

He had several children by his wife Střezislava. Six of his sons are known by name:
Soběslav (his heir)
Saint Adalbert
 Spytimír
 Pobraslav
 Pořej
 Čáslav

He had also a son named Radim Gaudentius by another woman (probably a concubine). According to Chronica Boemorum, Slavník was a happy man all his lifetime.

References

981 deaths
10th-century rulers in Europe
Year of birth unknown
Slavník dynasty